Adriano Pedrosa is a Brazilian curator. He is the artistic director of the São Paulo Museum of Art (MASP) and the 2024 Venice Biennale. Among Pedrosa's most well-known curated shows is Histórias, a series of shows at MASP each examining in depth a different theme, often a community or identity. These shows have included Histórias da Sexualidade (2017), focused on histories of sexuality; Histórias Afro-Atlânticas (2018), focused on the African diaspora and legacy of the Transatlantic slave trade; and Histórias Brasileiras (2022), focused on histories of Brazil.

References

Further reading 

 
 
 
 
 

Living people
Brazilian curators
Venice Biennale artistic directors
Year of birth missing (living people)